Splitting may refer to:
 Splitting (psychology)
 Lumpers and splitters, in classification or taxonomy
 Wood splitting
 Tongue splitting
 Splitting, railway operation

Mathematics
 Heegaard splitting
 Splitting field
 Splitting principle
 Splitting theorem
 Splitting lemma
 for the numerical method to solve differential equations, see Symplectic integrator

See also

 Split (disambiguation)
 Splitter (disambiguation)